Pseudagrion torridum is a species of damselfly in the family Coenagrionidae. It is found in Burkina Faso, Ivory Coast, Egypt, Ethiopia, Ghana, Guinea, Kenya, Mali, Nigeria, Senegal, Sudan, Tanzania, Uganda, and Zambia. Its natural habitats are freshwater lakes and freshwater marshes.

References

Coenagrionidae
Insects described in 1876
Taxonomy articles created by Polbot